BGUSAT was an Israeli research CubeSat built by the IAI and Ben Gurion University.

Mission
BGUSAT was a research satellite designed to explore atmospheric and weather phenomena in infra-red wavelengths, analyzing atmospheric gaseous contents and atmospheric glow. As a student research satellite, it allowed the students to gain experience with the development and integration of a nano-satellite.

Satellite
The satellite was a basic 3U CubeSat (30 x 10 x 10 cm) with a mass of about 5 kg.
The onboard computer was a GR712RC designed by Ramon Chips and Cobham Gaisle.

The camera payload was a small camera, working in the wavelength of IR and NIR 1.7 - 1.55 .
The ground station was operated by the researchers and students of Ben Gurion University.

History
Originally called NEGEVSAT, the project started as a Ben Gurion University student project in 2008. Originally planned as a 1U CubeSat (10 x 10 x 10 cm) the satellite was planned in conjunction of the Faculty of Engineering Sciences. The students worked on the design of the altitude and control system, the power system and ground station operations. After a few years, the project was put on hold due to lack of funding.

By 2013, the BGUSAT project was restarted. With the donation of Rachel and Max Javit from Connecticut, the satellite's design evolved to a 3U CubeSat  (30x10x10 cm) with a small earth observation camera. The donation allowed also for a small GPS and communication device and initial ground station operations. Collaboration with IAI to use their CubeSat bus platform and a new on board computer.

In addition, a sum of 1 Million NIS was dedicated by the Israeli Space Agency for research and image processing of the images received from the satellite.

BGUSAT was successfully launched on February 15, 2017, 03:58 UTC on PSLV-C37 on a record-breaking launch which released 104 satellites. The Israeli DIDO-2 nano-satellite was also launched in the same launch.

BGUSAT decayed from orbit on February 24, 2023.

Mission Patch
The mission patch was designed by Tal Inbar and Igal Gabai to look like the silhouette of the head of David Ben-Gurion, surrounded by an orange lining representing the Negev area. The satellite watches the Earth and Israel, while the blue glow represents the atmospheric studies. The constellation Columba (Dove in Hebrew) is shown representing peace as well as the launch date, February, in which Columba is clearly seen over the Israeli skies. The Israeli flag, Ben Gurion University's logo and the Israeli space agency's logos are clearly seen.

See also

 2017 in spaceflight

References

External links 
 BGUSAT website at Ben Gurion University website
 BGUSAT on Guther's Space Page

Earth observation satellites of Israel
IAI satellites
Spacecraft launched in 2017
Spacecraft which reentered in 2023
2017 in Israel
Spacecraft launched by PSLV rockets